Rolf Reine Almqvist (born 12 April 1949) is a Swedish former professional football player and coach who played as striker.

Club career
Almqvist played for IFK Göteborg, Åtvidabergs FF, IFK Sundsvall, In 1980, he joined the Seattle Sounders of the North American Soccer League, playing five games during the outdoor season and another seventeen during the 1980–81 NASL indoor season.  He then returned to Sweden and played for BK Häcken, Ope IF and Djerv 1919. He was the Allsvenskan top scorer in 1969 and 1977.

International career 
Almqvist won four caps and scored one goal between 1970 and 1979 for the Sweden national team. He also represented the Sweden U19 and U21 teams.

Managerial career
Almqvist coached IF Olsfors, Kullens BK, BK Häcken, Djerv 1919, Fredrikstad FK, Helsingborgs IF, IFK Göteborg, Landskrona BoIS, Bryne, FK Tønsberg and Västra Frölunda IF.

Career statistics

International 

 Scores and results list Sweden's goal tally first, score column indicates score after each Almqvist goal.

Honours 
IFK Göteborg

 Allsvenskan: 1969

Åtvidabergs FF

 Allsvenskan: 1973

Individual

 Allsvenskan top scorer: 1969, 1977

References

External links
 Seattle Sounders stats
 

1949 births
Living people
Swedish footballers
Footballers from Gothenburg
Association football forwards
Sweden international footballers
Allsvenskan players
IFK Göteborg players
Åtvidabergs FF players
IFK Sundsvall players
Seattle Sounders (1974–1983) players
BK Häcken players
SK Djerv 1919 players
North American Soccer League (1968–1984) indoor players
North American Soccer League (1968–1984) players
Swedish football managers
BK Häcken managers
Fredrikstad FK managers
Helsingborgs IF managers
IFK Göteborg managers
Landskrona BoIS managers
Bryne FK managers
Halmstads BK non-playing staff
Swedish expatriate footballers
Swedish expatriate football managers
Swedish expatriate sportspeople in the United States
Expatriate soccer players in the United States
Swedish expatriate sportspeople in Norway
Expatriate footballers in Norway
Expatriate football managers in Norway